Minuscule 448 (in the Gregory-Aland numbering), ε 509 (in the Soden numbering), is a Greek minuscule manuscript of the New Testament, on parchment. It is dated by a colophon to the year 1478. It has marginalia.

Description 

The codex contains a complete text of the four Gospels on 299 parchment leaves. The text is written in one column per page, in 22 lines per page.

It is clearly but unskilfully written.

Text 

The Greek text of the codex is a representative of the Byzantine text-type. Hermann von Soden classified it to the Antiocheian (i.e. Byzantine) commentated text. Aland placed it in Category V. According to the Claremont Profile Method it represents the textual family Kx in Luke 1 and Luke 20. It belongs also to the textual cluster 183. In Luke 10 no profile was made.

History 

According to the colophon it was written in Rome, April 25, 1478 by John Rhosos of Crete for Francis Gonzaga Cardinal of St. Maria Nuova. There is a note that Rhosos also wrote the Vatican Homer in 1477 for Cardinal Gonazaga. Then it belonged to Giovanni Pietro Arrivabene. Nathaniel Noel purchased it for the Harleian Library between 20 January between 1721 and 1722.

The manuscript was added to the list of New Testament manuscripts by Scholz (1794–1852). It was examined by Scholz (only Mark 5). C. R. Gregory saw it in 1883.

It is currently housed at the British Library (Harley MS 5790).

See also 

 List of New Testament minuscules
 Biblical manuscript
 Textual criticism

References

Further reading 

 Cyril Ernest Wright, Manuscripts of Italian Provenance in the Harleian Collection in the British Museum: Their Sources, Associations and Channels of Acquisition, in Cultural Aspects of the Italian Renaissance. Essays in Honour of Paul Oskar Kristeller, ed. by C. H. Clough (Manchester: Manchester University Press, 1976), pp. 462–84 (p. 474).
 Repertorium der griechischen Kopisten 800-1600, ed. by Ernst Gamillscheg and Dieter Harlfinger, Veröffentlichungen der Kommission für Byzantinistik, 3-1, ed. by Herbert Hunger (Vienna: Österreichischen Akademie der Wissenschaften, 1981- ), I: Handschriften aus Bibliotheken Grossbritanniens, 3 vols, I, no. 178.

External links 
 Harley MS 5790 at the British Library

Greek New Testament minuscules
15th-century biblical manuscripts
Harleian Collection